Thomas Hartigan (8 December 1878 – 2 May 1963) was an Australian cricketer. He played one first-class match for New South Wales in 1907/08.

See also
 List of New South Wales representative cricketers

References

External links
 

1878 births
1963 deaths
Australian cricketers
New South Wales cricketers
Cricketers from Sydney